A stook /stʊk/, also referred to as a shock or stack, is an arrangement of sheaves of cut grain-stalks placed so as to keep the grain-heads off the ground while still in the field and before collection for threshing. Stooked grain sheaves are typically wheat, barley and oats. In the era before combine harvesters and powered grain driers, stooking was necessary to dry the grain for a period of days to weeks before threshing, to achieve a moisture level low enough for storage. In the 21st century, most grain is produced with the mechanized and powered methods, and is therefore not stooked at all. However, stooking remains useful to smallholders who grow their own grain, or at least some of it, as opposed to buying it.

Overview
The purpose of a stook [or 'stooking'] is to dry the unthreshed grain while protecting it from vermin until it is brought into long-term storage. The unthreshed grain also cures while in a stook. In England, sheaves were commonly stacked in stooks of twelve and may therefore refer to twelve sheaves.

Stook may also have a general meaning of 'bundle' or 'heap' and applicable to items other than sheaves or bales. For example, in the era when traditional hay-making was common, raked-up piles of hay were also called stooks, shocks, or ricks. Today baling has largely replaced the stook method of drying hay, or hay is chopped and ensilaged either in silos or on the ground inside polymer wrappers to make haylage.

In North America, a stook may also refer to a field stack of six, ten or fifteen small, rectangular bales of hay or straw.  These bales may be stacked and deposited by a  "stooking machine" or "stooker" that is dragged, sled-like, behind the baler. The stooking sled has four, five, or six fingers that hold the bales until the stook is complete.  When the stook is complete the "stacker" steps on a lever to release the stook.  The fingers drop to the ground and the finished stook slides off the fingers.  The sled resets itself and is ready to be filled again. The bales are stacked on the diagonal to shed the rain and to minimise acquiring moisture from the ground before being picked up.  An automatic bale stooker was eventually designed to eliminate the need for a person to manually stack and trip the stook-release.  The automatic stooker is positioned behind the baler and collects released bales and sends them up an inclined shute.  The bale falls through a series of bars into the "3-2-1"  configuration.  Once all six bales are in position the platform trips, drops the stook in the field, and automatically returns to the loading position.  Allied produced a model of stooker in the 1980s that can still be found across the countryside in Canada today.

Shocking or stooking
Before mechanical harvesting became the norm, a common agricultural practice was to manually cut sheaves of grain, tie them in bundles, and stack them against one another vertically to form a "shock" so that they could air dry. In the era before combine harvesters and powered grain driers, stooking was necessary to dry the grain for a period of days to weeks before threshing, to achieve a moisture level low enough for storage. In the 21st century, most grain is produced with the mechanized and powered methods, and is therefore not stocked at all. However, stooking remains useful to smallholders who grow their own grain, or at least some of it, as opposed to buying it.

References

See also
Sheaf

Harvest